This article presents a list of the historical events and publications of Australian literature during 1931.

Books 

 M. Barnard Eldershaw – Green Memory
 Miles Franklin
 Back to Bool Bool
 Old Blastus of Bandicoot
 Ion Idriess – Lasseter's Last Ride
 Jack Lindsay –  Cressida's First Lover : a tale of ancient Greece
 Alice Grant Rosman – The Sixth Journey
 E. V. Timms – Whitehall
 Arthur W. Upfield – The Sands of Windee

Short stories 

 J. H. M. Abbott – The King's School and Other Tales for Old Boys
 Vance Palmer – Separate Lives
 Henry Handel Richardson – Two Studies

Children's and Young Adult 

 Mary Grant Bruce – Bill of Billabong
 Frank Dalby Davison – Man-Shy
 Lilian Turner – Two Take the Road

Poetry 

 Mary Gilmore – The Rue Tree : Poems
 Ronald McCuaig – "Love Me and Never Leave Me"
 John Shaw Neilson – "The Bard and the Lizard"
 Elizabeth Riddell – "Lifesaver"
 Kenneth Slessor – "Five Visions of Captain Cook"

Biography 

 Ion Idriess – Lasseter's Last Ride : An Epic of Central Australian Gold Discovery

Awards and honours

Literary

Births 

A list, ordered by date of birth (and, if the date is either unspecified or repeated, ordered alphabetically by surname) of births in 1931 of Australian literary figures, authors of written works or literature-related individuals follows, including year of death.

 30 January – Shirley Hazzard, novelist (died 2016)
24 February – Barry Oakley, novelist and playwright
15 March – Laurie Hergenhan, literary scholar (died 2019)
 28 March – Philip Martin, poet (died 2005)
 10 November – Evan Jones, poet (died 2022)

Unknown date
 Peter Mathers, novelist (died 2004)

Deaths 

A list, ordered by date of death (and, if the date is either unspecified or repeated, ordered alphabetically by surname) of deaths in 1931 of Australian literary figures, authors of written works or literature-related individuals follows, including year of birth.

 1 August – Bertha McNamara, writer and political activist (born 1853 in Poland)
22 August – Edward Dyson, editor, poet and short story writer (born 1865)

See also 
 1931 in poetry
 List of years in literature
 List of years in Australian literature
 1931 in literature
 1930 in Australian literature
 1931 in Australia
 1932 in Australian literature

References

Literature
Australian literature by year
20th-century Australian literature